Sarabadiyeh-ye Olya (also Romanized as Sarābādīyeh-ye ‘Olyā; also known as Sar Ābādeyeh, Sarāb Bādīyeh, Sarāb Bādīyeh-ye ‘Olyā, Sarāb Buiyān, Sarāb-e Bādīeh, and Sarāb-e Bādīyeh) is a village in Howmeh Rural District, in the Central District of Harsin County, Kermanshah Province, Iran. At the 2006 census, its population was 112, in 23 families.

References 

Populated places in Harsin County